The Australian Girls' Amateur is the national junior golf championship of Australia for girls. It was first played in 1953. It is run by Golf Australia.

History
From 1953 to 1983 the event was for "juniors" (under-21) and was played in conjunction with the stroke-play qualifying stage of the Australian Women's Amateur. From 1953 to 1973 and from 1978 to 1983 qualification was over 36-holes but from 1974 to 1977 it was over 72 holes. However in 1974 the junior event was still decided by the scores over the first 36 holes, while in 1975 and 1976 the junior event was decided over the first 54 holes. From 1984 it became a separate event. From 1984 to 1999 it was played as a match-play event with a 36-hole final. In 1993 the age limit was reduced from 21 to 18. In 2000 it became a 54-hole stroke-play event, before being extended to 72 holes in 2012.

Winners

2022 Jeneath Wong
2021 Jeneath Wong
2020 Not played
2019 Hye Park
2018 Maddison Hinson-Tolchard
2017 Grace Kim
2016 Karis Davidson
2015 Celina Yuan
2014 Konomi Matsumoto
2013 Minjee Lee
2012 Su-Hyun Oh
2011 Cathleen Santoso
2010 Annie Choi
2009 Ashley Ona
2008 Whitney Hillier
2007 Haeji Kang
2006 Sarah Oh
2005 Mi Sun Cho
2004 Mi Sun Cho
2003 Sarah Kemp
2002 Sarah Jane Kenyon
2001 Kyla Welsh
2000 Dana Lacey
1999 Melanie Holmes-Smith
1998 Gloria Park
1997 Gloria Park
1996 Gloria Park
1995 Tammie Durdin
1994 Stacey Doggett
1993 Simone Williams
1992 Loraine Lambert
1991 Cathy Neilson
1990 Trudi Jeffrey
1989 Wendy Doolan
1988 Mardi Lunn
1987 Mardi Lunn
1986 Mardi Lunn
1985 Louise Mullard
1984 Elizabeth Wilson
1983 Louise Mullard
1982 Jane Connachan
1981 Diane Mancell
1980 Penny Edmunds andDiane Mancell
1979 Edwina Kennedy
1978 Edwina Kennedy
1977 Edwina Kennedy
1976 Edwina Kennedy
1975 Jane Lock
1974 Jane Lock
1973 Jane Lock
1972 Vicki Jellis
1971 Jan Stephenson
1970 Sandra Williams
1969 Gayle Flynn
1968 Jan Stephenson
1967 Jan Stephenson
1966 Marea Hickey
1965 Marea Hickey
1964 Robyn Bennett
1963 Beatrice Hayley
1962 Beatrice Hayley
1961 Barbara Coulson
1960 Beverley Ross
1959 Gail Corry
1958 Nicki Campbell
1957 Dorothy Gardiner
1956 Pam Main
1955 June Gillespie
1954 June Gillespie
1953 Margaret Masters

Source

See also
Australian Women's Amateur

References

External links

Amateur golf tournaments in Australia
Youth sport in Australia
Women's golf in Australia